Thiruvengadam Lakshman Sankar (1928-2018) is an Indian energy expert, civil servant, corporate executive and the former head of Asian Energy Survey of the Asian Development Bank. He is a former chairman of the Andhra Pradesh Gas Power Corporation Limited and Transmission Corporation of Andhra Pradesh. Securing his MSc degree in physical chemistry from the University of Madras and MA degree in development economics from Wilson College, he entered the Indian Administrative Service where he held positions such as the Secretary of the Fuel Policy Committee from 1970 to 1975 and the Principal Secretary of the Working Group on Energy Policy from 1978 to 1979. In 2007, he headed a government committee, popularly known as the T. L. Shankar Committee, which proposed ways of reforming Indian coal sector. He is a non-executive chairman of KSK Energy Ventures and a United Nations adviser on Energy to the governments of Sri Lanka, Tanzania, Jamaica, North Korea and Bangladesh. He is a former board member of Hindustan Petroleum Corporation and a former member of the Integrated Energy Policy Committee of the Planning Commission of India. The Government of India awarded him the third highest civilian honour of the Padma Bhushan, in 2004, for his contributions to society. He passed on 26.12.2018 which was a tragic day for his family and people who had seen him work al these years. He had three sons - Ravi, Sachin and Nitin Sanker.

See also 
 Asian Development Bank

References

External links 
 

Recipients of the Padma Bhushan in civil service
People from Tamil Nadu
Indian Administrative Service officers
Indian corporate directors
Indian officials of the United Nations
University of Madras alumni
Wilson College (Pennsylvania) alumni
1928 births
2014 deaths
People associated with energy